Canada Gate forms part of the Queen Victoria Memorial scheme in London. An entrance to the Green Park, one of the eight Royal Parks in central London, the gate was presented to London by Canada (then the senior Dominion of the British Empire) as part of a vast memorial scheme dedicated to Queen Victoria, who died in 1901.

The entire memorial, more an act of town planning than funerary monument, was designed by Sir Aston Webb. It takes the form of a processional route from Trafalgar Square to Buckingham Palace. Beginning at Admiralty Arch, the project takes in The Mall and culminates in a "rond point" before the palace, with Sir Thomas Brock's  Victoria Memorial at its centre. The Canada Gate was commissioned, in 1905, along with the gates for Buckingham Palace and two other similar, but smaller gates presented by Australia and South Africa. The commission was won by the Bromsgrove Guild (a company of modern artists and designers associated with the Arts and Crafts Movement) who completed the work and had the gate in situ by 1911.

The gate stands to the north side of the "rond point" at the junction with Constitution Hill; today, a congested roundabout, but occasionally closed to traffic when the Mall is required for state processions from the palace. From the gate, a long double avenue stretches the width of the park through to Piccadilly.

The gate is in the same style as those of Buckingham Palace and bears the coats of arms of six of the seven Canadian provinces of the time (left to right: Manitoba, Ontario, Quebec, Nova Scotia, New Brunswick, and Prince Edward Island), while in the centre of the gate is the original coat of arms of Canada of 1868. In design, Canada Gate takes the form of a screen consisting of 5 portals of gilded wrought iron, the central section being the principal and largest gate; the double gates are supported on columns of iron. The two wrought iron bays flanking the central gate contain smaller gates, while the two terminating bays contain smaller pedestrian gates. The screen is terminated by two massive pillars of Portland stone surmounted by patriotic statuary. On the pillars are reliefs of the shields of three other Canadian provinces, British Columbia (left) and Alberta and Saskatchewan (both right). The flanking inner columns are smaller and, like the iron posts, are crowned by gas lanterns of similar design to those on the pillars of the palace railings.

References

See also
 Canada Memorial

Grade I listed gates
Canada–United Kingdom relations
Tourist attractions in the City of Westminster
1911 establishments in England
Buildings and structures in Green Park